Tea bowl may refer to:

 Chawan, an East Asian tea bowl
 Gaiwan, a Chinese tea bowl with a lid and a saucer